The 1991 Nevada Wolf Pack football team was an American football team that represented the University of Nevada, Reno in the Big Sky Conference (BSC) during the 1991 NCAA Division I-AA football season. In their 16th season under head coach Chris Ault, the Wolf Pack compiled a 12–2 record (8–0 against conference opponents), won the BSC championship and lost to Youngstown State, the eventual national champion, in the NCAA Division I-AA Quarterfinals. They played their home games at Mackay Stadium.

This was the Wolf Pack's last year as a member of the BSC and I-AA (now FCS) as they joined the Big West Conference and the NCAA Division I-A—now the known as the NCAA Division I Football Bowl Subdivision (FBS)—for the 1992 season.

Schedule

References

Nevada
Nevada Wolf Pack football seasons
Big Sky Conference football champion seasons
Nevada Wolf Pack football